Luis Alfredo Urruti Giménez (born 11 September 1992) is a Uruguayan footballer who plays as a midfielder for Universitario in Peru on loan from Uruguayan Primera División club River Plate.

References

External links
Profile at FOX Sports

1992 births
Living people
Uruguayan footballers
Uruguayan expatriate footballers
Cerro Largo F.C. players
Peñarol players
Centro Atlético Fénix players
Club Atlético River Plate (Montevideo) players
Club Universitario de Deportes footballers
Uruguayan Primera División players
Peruvian Primera División players
Association football midfielders
Uruguayan expatriate sportspeople in Peru
Expatriate footballers in Peru